Scorn is an English electronic music project. The group was formed in the early 1990s as a project of former Napalm Death members Mick Harris and Nic Bullen. Bullen left the group in 1995 and the project continued on until the end of 2011, as an essentially solo project for Harris. Harris restarted the project in 2019.

History
Scorn was formed in 1991 in Birmingham, England, by drummer Mick Harris and vocalist/bassist Nic Bullen, former members of English grindcore band Napalm Death. Upon Bullen's departure in April 1995, Harris remained the only member of the project. Scorn has often been associated with industrial and experimental music, particularly with their Earache Records-era output between 1991 until 1994. Since the departure of Bullen in 1995, much of the output has been minimalist beats with an emphasis on very deep bass lines, often resembling dub and trip hop in structure.

Justin Broadrick (also a former Napalm Death member) provided guitar for the first LP, Vae Solis. The EP Lick Forever Dog was formed of remixes from the album. Evanescence featured James Plotkin on guitar and was followed by the remix album Ellipsis which featured reworkings by Autechre, Coil, Bill Laswell, Meat Beat Manifesto and Robin Rimbaud. Harris parted ways with Earache after the Logghi Barogghi release, both sides having been unhappy with how the project was being handled.

Many fans of his drumming were confused by the contrast in musical style between Napalm Death and Scorn, but Harris saw it as a natural progression, telling Decibel in 2012: "For the ideas that I had, I needed to make that move. Some people think that it was a crazy move, just as grind was maybe starting to go places, do something, but I’ve always been an experimenter, still am; I’m someone who just loves sound."

Having left Earache Records, the project kept pushing the heavy bass sound, subtly changing with each release. The downtempo sound gained Harris an underground following and he was seen as an early originator of dubstep. In May 1997, Harris decided to end the project in order to finish relations with KK Records, after they refused to fund a collaboration with Bill Laswell and a rapper. After pursuing other projects, Harris returned with two critically acclaimed Scorn albums on Hymen Records, Greetings from Birmingham and Plan B. Scorn then released a one track live mix called List of Takers in 2004 on Vivo Records.

Scorn returned in 2007 with Stealth on Ad Noiseam with the CD version released on Kurt Gluck's Ohm Resistance label. Scorn then released 12" records on Combat Records and Record Label Records in 2008. Another full-length album entitled Refuse; Start Fires, again was released on Ohm Resistance in 2010. This album also marked the first time since Bullen left the project that Harris has worked full-on with another musician (excluding the track Scorn did with David Knight on the "Rise|Converge" compilation), drummer Yan Treasey. On the heels of this full-length, Harris returned with the "Yozza" EP in 2011, again with Treasey.

In November 2011, Harris stated the Scorn project was "put to bed".

Relaunch 

On 17 January 2019, the Ohm Resistance label announced that Scorn was back and would release an EP in early 2019, with an album to follow. The EP of four new tracks, was called Feather. The full-length album, Cafe Mor, was released in November and featured a collaboration with Jason Williamson of Sleaford Mods. Daniele Antezza of Dadub mastered the album. Harris intended to tour in 2020 with a new Akai MPC liveset but was forced to cancel due to the COVID-19 pandemic. He then released a studio album, The Only Place in 2021, with one track featruing a collaboration with Kool Keith.

Members

Current members
 Mick Harris - electronics (1991–1997, 2000–2011, 2019–present), drums (1991–1993)

Former members
 Nic Bullen - vocals, bass, electronics (1991–1995)

Former session/touring musicians
 Justin Broadrick - guitar (1991–1992)
 Pat McCahan - guitar (1992)
 James Plotkin - guitar, guitar synthesizer (1994)

Timeline

Discography

Albums
1992 - Vae Solis (Earache)
1993 - Colossus (Earache)
1994 - Evanescence (Earache)
1995 - Gyral (Earache)
1996 - Logghi Barogghi (Earache)
1997 - Zander (Invisible)
2000 - Greetings from Birmingham (Hymen Records)
2002 - Plan B (Hymen Records)
2004 - List of Takers (Vivo)
2007 - Stealth (Ad Noiseam, Ohm Resistance)
2010 - Refuse; Start Fires (Ohm Resistance)
2019 - Cafe Mor (Ohm Resistance)
2021 - The Only Place (Ohm Resistance)

Live albums
1997 - Whine (Invisible)

Remix albums
1995 - Ellipsis (Earache)

Compilation albums
1999 - Anamnesis: 1994-97 (Invisible)

Singles & EPs

1992 - Lick Forever Dog (Earache)
1992 - Deliverance (Earache)
1993 - White Irises Blind (Earache)
1993 - Lament (Dying Earth Records)
1994 - Silver Rain Fell (Earache)
1995 - Falling / The End (Remixes) (Scorn Recordings)
1995 - Stairway (Scorn Recordings)
1996 - Leave It Out (Possible)
2000 - Imaginaria Award (Hymen Records)
2002 - Governor (Hymen Records)
2007 - Whistle for It (ÜNE (r)ecords)
2008 - Super Mantis (Combat Recordings)
2008 - Super Mantis Remixes (Combat Recordings)
2009 - In The Margins (Record Label Records)
2009 - Gravel Bed (Combat Recordings)
2010 - Super Mantis / Gravel Bed (Remixes) (Combat Recordings)
2011 - Yozza (Ohm Resistance)
2019 - Feather (Ohm Resistance)
2021 - Distortion (Kool Keith + Scorn + Submerged, Ohm Resistance)
2021 - Dutch Radio Live Studio Session (recorded September 5, 1994)

References

External links
Scorn discography at Discogs.com
Scorn Video Report on OC-TV.net

English electronic music duos
British industrial music groups
Musical groups from Birmingham, West Midlands
One-man bands
Earache Records artists
Musical groups established in 1991
British industrial metal musical groups